The Eyes of Stanley Pain is an album by Download.

Track listing
 "Suni C" – 5:29
 "Possession" – 4:07
 "The Turin Cloud" – 4:31
 "Glassblower" – 3:01
 "H Sien Influence" – 4:45
 "Base Metal" – 5:00
 "Collision" – 10:37
 "Sidewinder" – 4:18
 "Outafter" – 4:56
 "Killfly" – 4:04
 "Separate" – 5:53
 "Seven Plagues" – 4:48
 "Fire This Ground (Puppy Gristle, Pt. 1)" – 5:06 (see "Notes")
 "The Eyes of Stanley Pain" – 4:47

Personnel
cEvin Key
Dwayne Goettel
Mark Spybey - vocals, lyrics, and various other sounds

Guests
Genesis P. Orridge (vocals - 5, 11; gristlebox - 13)
Anthony Valcic (keys - 4)
Larry Thrasher (drums - 13)
Philth (keys - 7)

Design
Dave McKean - design and illustration
Lorne Bridgman - "Download" photo

Notes
The track "Outafter" is dedicated to Brandon Lee. It was originally to be used as a Skinny Puppy song for the movie The Crow, though plans fell through. Lee was also a Puppy fan.
"Fire This Ground" is subtitled as "Puppy Gristle, Pt. 1", referring to the 1994 jam between Skinny Puppy and members of Psychic TV/Throbbing Gristle, which was later released as the Skinny Puppy album Puppy Gristle.
The inside cover contains a quote from French poet Charles Baudelaire:
"that which is not slightly distorted lacks sensible appeal: from which it follows that irregularity - that is to say, the unexpected, surprise and astonishment, are an essential part and characteristic of beauty"
The track "Collision" contains a notably contrasting part which is more harmonic and rhythmically concise than the rest of the track. The initiating rhythmic loop of this "embedded" part begins exactly 7 minutes and 7 seconds into the track. "Collision" being track 7 arguably indicates a deliberate choice of timing.

References

External links
Litany Page for the album (with lyrics)

1996 albums
Albums with cover art by Dave McKean
Download (band) albums